Trout Hall is an historic home located at Allentown in Lehigh County, Pennsylvania. One of the older homes in Allentown (1910 Walnut Street is the oldest), it was built between 1768 and 1770, and is a two-and-one-half-story, stone dwelling in the Georgian style.

Built as a summer home by James Allen, the third son of William Allen, founder of Allentown, it currently houses the library and museum of the Lehigh County Historical Society.

History
In 1735, William Allen (1704-1780) a wealthy shipping merchant, purchased 5,000 acres of land in eastern Pennsylvania. By 1762, he had laid out the plans of a 42-block town that he called Northampton. The name however, never took hold, and the settlement was commonly known as Allen's Town, and then simply combined to Allenstown, and eventually became Allentown.

James (1742-1778), Allen's third son, followed in his father's footsteps. After graduating from college in 1759 and law school in 1765, he was admitted to practice law before the Supreme Court. On October 6, 1767, he was elected as common councilman in Philadelphia and later elected to the Assembly by an almost unanimous vote. Since his busy life allowed little time to manage Allentown himself, he delegated the responsibilities of running it to the people he trusted most. At times, however, he would make the 60 mile journey from Philadelphia to Allentown, eventually justifying the need for his own house. He decided to build a two-story stone house, which he called Trout Hall, after the abundance of game trout along the various creeks and the Lehigh River that surrounded Allentown. James Allen died of tuberculosis on September 19, 1778. After he died, his wife remarried and his daughters became frequent residents.

On May 17, 1789, James Allen's daughters left Allentown, and the home would be unused until the winter of 1825. James’ eldest daughter, Anne Penn Greanleaf, gave a few blocks of the original property where Trout Hall was situated to her daughter. It was at this time that the name Trout Hall was dropped and the home was renamed “The Livingston Mansion”.

The Livingstons were merchants, and in 1847, when a business deal went bad the house and surrounding land was sold to make up for his lost profits. The new owner, Comegys Paul, sold the house a week later and earned a tidy profit for the sale. In 1848 it became the Allentown Seminary, and in 1867 it became the original location of Muhlenberg College.

On January 9, 1904, the Lehigh County Historical Society was founded to find and restore historical landmarks in Lehigh County. Their goal was to preserve the home's past and one way the Society planned to do this was to restore the east wing that had not been touched in decades. One year later, in 1905, Muhlenberg College relocated its campus, and the Historical Society renamed the building Trout Hall again.

Used now as a museum, it houses revolutionary artifacts for the public to view and also showcases its antiquated style of architecture.

It was added to the National Register of Historic Places in 1978.

See also
 List of historic places in Allentown, Pennsylvania

References

External links

Official website
Lehigh County Historical Society - Historic sites including Trout Hall

Historic house museums in Pennsylvania
Houses on the National Register of Historic Places in Pennsylvania
Georgian architecture in Pennsylvania
Houses completed in 1770
Museums in Allentown, Pennsylvania
History of Allentown, Pennsylvania
Houses in Lehigh County, Pennsylvania
Buildings and structures in Allentown, Pennsylvania
National Register of Historic Places in Lehigh County, Pennsylvania
1770 establishments in Pennsylvania